Energy modeling or energy system modeling is the process of building computer models of energy systems in order to analyze them.  Such models often employ scenario analysis to investigate different assumptions about the technical and economic conditions at play. Outputs may include the system feasibility, greenhouse gas emissions, cumulative financial costs, natural resource use, and energy efficiency of the system under investigation.  A wide range of techniques are employed, ranging from broadly economic to broadly engineering.   Mathematical optimization is often used to determine the least-cost in some sense.  Models can be international, regional, national, municipal, or stand-alone in scope.  Governments maintain national energy models for energy policy development.

Energy models are usually intended to contribute variously to system operations, engineering design, or energy policy development.  This page concentrates on policy models.  Individual building energy simulations are explicitly excluded, although they too are sometimes called energy models.  IPCC-style integrated assessment models, which also contain a representation of the world energy system and are used to examine global transformation pathways through to 2050 or 2100 are not considered here in detail.

Energy modeling has increased in importance as the need for climate change mitigation has grown in importance.  The energy supply sector is the largest contributor to global greenhouse gas emissions.  The IPCC reports that climate change mitigation will require a fundamental transformation of the energy supply system, including the substitution of unabated (not captured by CCS) fossil fuel conversion technologies by low-GHG alternatives.

Model types 

A wide variety of model types are in use.  This section attempts to categorize the key types and their usage.  The divisions provided are not hard and fast and mixed-paradigm models exist.  In addition, the results from more general models can be used to inform the specification of more detailed models, and vice versa, thereby creating a hierarchy of models.  Models may, in general, need to capture "complex dynamics such as:
 energy system operation
 technology stock turnover
 technology innovation
 firm and household behaviour
 energy and non-energy capital investment and labour market adjustment dynamics leading to economic restructuring
 infrastructure deployment and urban planning"

Models may be limited in scope to the electricity sector or they may attempt to cover an energy system in its entirety (see below).

Most energy models are used for scenario analysis.  A scenario is a coherent set of assumptions about a possible system.  New scenarios are tested against a baseline scenario – normally business-as-usual (BAU) – and the differences in outcome noted.

The time horizon of the model is an important consideration.  Single-year models – set in either the present or the future (say 2050) – assume a non-evolving capital structure and focus instead on the operational dynamics of the system.  Single-year models normally embed considerable temporal (typically hourly resolution) and technical detail (such as individual generation plant and transmissions lines).  Long-range models – cast over one or more decades (from the present until say 2050) – attempt to encapsulate the structural evolution of the system and are used to investigate capacity expansion and energy system transition issues.

Models often use mathematical optimization to solve for redundancy in the specification of the system.  Some of the techniques used derive from operations research.   Most rely on linear programming (including mixed-integer programming), although some use nonlinear programming.  Solvers may use classical or genetic optimisation, such as CMA-ES.  Models may be recursive-dynamic, solving sequentially for each time interval, and thus evolving through time.  Or they may be framed as a single forward-looking intertemporal problem, and thereby assume perfect foresight.  Single-year engineering-based models usually attempt to minimize the short-run financial cost, while single-year market-based models use optimization to determine market clearing.  Long-range models, usually spanning decades, attempt to minimize both the short and long-run costs as a single intertemporal problem.

The demand-side (or end-user domain) has historically received relatively scant attention, often modeled by just a simple demand curve.  End-user energy demand curves, in the short-run at least, are normally found to be highly inelastic.

As intermittent energy sources and energy demand management grow in importance, models have needed to adopt an hourly temporal resolution in order to better capture their real-time dynamics.  Long-range models are often limited to calculations at yearly intervals, based on typical day profiles, and are hence less suited to systems with significant variable renewable energy. Day-ahead dispatching optimization is used to aid in the planning of systems with a significant portion of intermittent energy production in which uncertainty around future energy predictions is accounted for using stochastic optimization.

Implementing languages include GAMS, MathProg, MATLAB, Mathematica, Python, Pyomo, R, Fortran, Java, C, C++, and Vensim.  Occasionally spreadsheets are used.

As noted, IPCC-style integrated models (also known as integrated assessment models or IAM) are not considered here in any detail.  Integrated models combine simplified sub-models of the world economy, agriculture and land-use, and the global climate system in addition to the world energy system.  Examples include GCAM, MESSAGE, and REMIND.

Published surveys on energy system modeling have focused on techniques, general classification, an overview, decentralized planning, modeling methods, renewables integration, energy efficiency policies, electric vehicle integration, international development, and the use of layered models to support climate protection policy.  Deep Decarbonization Pathways Project researchers have also analyzed model typologies.  A 2014 paper outlines the modeling challenges ahead as energy systems become more complex and human and social factors become increasingly relevant.

Electricity sector models 

Electricity sector models are used to model electricity systems.  The scope may be national or regional, depending on circumstances.  For instance, given the presence of national interconnectors, the western European electricity system may be modeled in its entirety.

Engineering-based models usually contain a good characterization of the technologies involved, including the high-voltage AC transmission grid where appropriate.  Some models (for instance, models for Germany) may assume a single common bus or "copper plate" where the grid is strong.  The demand-side in electricity sector models is typically represented by a fixed load profile.

Market-based models, in addition, represent the prevailing electricity market, which may include nodal pricing.

Game theory and agent-based models are used to capture and study strategic behavior within electricity markets.

Energy system models 

In addition to the electricity sector, energy system models include the heat, gas, mobility, and other sectors as appropriate.  Energy system models are often national in scope, but may be municipal or international.

So-called top-down models are broadly economic in nature and based on either partial equilibrium or general equilibrium.  General equilibrium models represent a specialized activity and require dedicated algorithms.  Partial equilibrium models are more common.

So-called bottom-up models capture the engineering well and often rely on techniques from operations research.  Individual plants are characterized by their efficiency curves (also known as input/output relations), nameplate capacities, investment costs (capex), and operating costs (opex).  Some models allow for these parameters to depend on external conditions, such as ambient temperature.

Producing hybrid top-down/bottom-up models to capture both the economics and the engineering has proved challenging.

Established models 

This section lists some of the major models in use.   These are typically run by national governments.
In a community effort, a large number of existing energy system models were collected in model fact sheets on the Open Energy Platform.

LEAP 

LEAP, the Low Emissions Analysis Platform (formerly known as the Long-range Energy Alternatives Planning System) is a software tool for energy policy analysis, air pollution abatement planning and climate change mitigation assessment.  

LEAP was developed at the Stockholm Environment Institute's (SEI) US Center.  LEAP can be used to examine city, statewide, national, and regional energy systems.  LEAP is normally used for studies of between 20–50 years.  Most of its calculations occur at yearly intervals.  LEAP allows policy analysts to create and evaluate alternative scenarios and to compare their energy requirements, social costs and benefits, and environmental impacts. As of June 2021, LEAP has over 6000 users in 200 countries and territories

Power system simulation 

General Electric's MAPS (Multi-Area Production Simulation) is a production simulation model used by various Regional Transmission Organizations and Independent System Operators in the United States to plan for the economic impact of proposed electric transmission and generation facilities in FERC-regulated electric wholesale markets. Portions of the model may also be used for the commitment and dispatch phase (updated on 5 minute intervals) in operation of wholesale electric markets for RTO and ISO regions. ABB's PROMOD is a similar software package. These ISO and RTO regions also utilize a GE software package called MARS (Multi-Area Reliability Simulation) to ensure the power system meets reliability criteria (a loss of load expectation (LOLE) of no greater than 0.1 days per year). Further, a GE software package called PSLF (Positive Sequence Load Flow) and a Siemens software package called PSSE (Power System Simulation for Engineering) analyzes load flow on the power system for short-circuits and stability during preliminary planning studies by RTOs and ISOs.

MARKAL/TIMES 

MARKAL (MARKet ALlocation) is an integrated energy systems modeling platform, used to analyze energy, economic, and environmental issues at the global, national, and municipal level over time-frames of up to several decades.  MARKAL can be used to quantify the impacts of policy options on technology development and natural resource depletion.  The software was developed by the Energy Technology Systems Analysis Programme (ETSAP) of the International Energy Agency (IEA) over a period of almost two decades.

TIMES (The Integrated MARKAL-EFOM System) is an evolution of MARKAL – both energy models have many similarities.  TIMES succeeded MARKAL in 2008.  Both models are technology explicit, dynamic partial equilibrium models of energy markets. In both cases, the equilibrium is determined by maximizing the total consumer and producer surplus via linear programming.  Both MARKAL and TIMES are written in GAMS.

The TIMES model generator was also developed under the Energy Technology Systems Analysis Program (ETSAP).  TIMES combines two different, but complementary, systematic approaches to modeling energy – a technical engineering approach and an economic approach.  TIMES is a technology rich, bottom-up model generator, which uses linear programming to produce a least-cost energy system, optimized according to a number of user-specified constraints, over the medium to long-term.  It is used for "the exploration of possible energy futures based on contrasted scenarios".

, the MARKAL and TIMES model generators are in use in 177 institutions spread over 70 countries.

NEMS 

NEMS (National Energy Modeling System) is a long-standing United States government policy model, run by the Department of Energy (DOE).  NEMS computes equilibrium fuel prices and quantities for the US energy sector.  To do so, the software iteratively solves a sequence of linear programs and nonlinear equations.  NEMS has been used to explicitly model the demand-side, in particular to determine consumer technology choices in the residential and commercial building sectors.

NEMS is used to produce the Annual Energy Outlook each year – for instance in 2015.

Criticisms 

Public policy energy models have been criticized for being insufficiently transparent.  The source code and data sets should at least be available for peer review, if not explicitly published.  To improve transparency and public acceptance, some models are undertaken as open-source software projects, often developing a diverse community as they proceed.  OSeMOSYS is one such example.

Not a criticism perse, but it is necessary to understand that model results do not constitute future predictions.

See also 

General

 Climate change mitigation – actions to limit long-term climate change
 Climate change mitigation scenarios – possible futures in which global warming is reduced by deliberate actions
 Economic model
 Energy system – the interpretation of the energy sector in system terms
 Energy Modeling Forum – a Stanford University-based modeling forum
 Open Energy Modelling Initiative – an open source energy modeling initiative, centered on Europe
 Open energy system databases – database projects which collect, clean, and republish energy-related datasets 
 Open energy system models – a review of energy system models that are also open source
 Power system simulation

Models

 ACEGES – a global agent-based computational economics model
 iNEMS (Integrated National Energy Modeling System) – a national energy model for China
 MARKAL – an energy model
 NEMS – the US government national energy model
 POLES (Prospective Outlook on Long-term Energy Systems) – an energy sector world simulation model
 KAPSARC Energy Model - an energy sector model for Saudi Arabia

Further reading 

 Introductory video on open energy system modeling with python language example
 Introductory video with reference to public policy

References

External links 

 COST TD1207 Mathematical Optimization in the Decision Support Systems for Efficient and Robust Energy Networks wiki – a typology for optimization models
 EnergyPLAN — a freeware energy model from the Department of Development and Planning, Aalborg University, Denmark
 Open Energy Modelling Initiative open models page – a list of open energy models
 model.energy — an online "toy" model utilizing the PyPSA framework that allows the public to experiment 
 Building Energy Modeling Tools by National Renewable Energy Laboratory

Climate change policy
Computational science
Computer programming
Economics models
Energy models
Energy policy
Mathematical modeling
Mathematical optimization
Simulation
Systems theory